Nagpuri may refer to the following entities associated with India:

 Nagpuri people, an ethnic group native to Jharkhand and surrounding areas
 Nagpuri language, or Sadri, a language spoken in Jharkhand and surrounding areas
 Nagpuri dialect (Maharashtra), a variety of the Varhadi dialect spoken in Nagpur, Maharashtra
 Nagpuri (buffalo), a breed of cattle from Maharashtra

See also 
 Nagpuri cinema
 Nagpuria dialect (Garhwal)
 Nagpur (disambiguation)
 Nagpuria (disambiguation)

Language and nationality disambiguation pages